Themis Klarides (born August 3, 1965) is an American attorney and politician from the state of Connecticut. She served in the Connecticut House of Representatives, serving as House Minority Leader from 2015 through 2021. In that position, she was the highest ranking woman in the legislature. She was also the first woman to lead Republican members in the House of Representatives.

Early life and education

Klarides, a resident of Derby, Connecticut,  is a native of Seymour, Connecticut. Her parents, Peter and Theodora Klarides, were immigrants from Greece who owned a local supermarket She graduated from Trinity College and the Quinnipiac University School of Law. Prior to a career in politics and law, Klarides worked as a model and competed as a body builder, as well as appearing as a ring girl on WWE’s flagship program Monday Night Raw.

Professional career

Klarides is admitted to practice law in Connecticut and the U.S. District Court for the District of Connecticut. She is a member of the Association for Conflict Resolution, the Connecticut Bar Association and the New Haven County Bar Association. She is currently employed at Cohen & Wolf as a member of the firm's litigation and bankruptcy groups.

As a member of the Walter Camp Football Foundation, Klarides is committed to improving education for all of Connecticut’s children. In 2010, Klarides was given the annual “Champion of Youth” award by the Connecticut Coalition of Boys & Girls Clubs. She also received the 2010 “Children’s Champion” award given annually by the Connecticut Early Childhood Alliance

She has worked closely with The Umbrella, Center for Domestic Violence Services (A program of BHcare), working to assist victims of domestic violence and providing volunteer legal assistance to women and children at the shelter for victims of domestic violence.

Klarides has received several awards from Mothers Against Drunk Driving (MADD), and received their Government Leaders Against Drunk Driving Award in 2016 for her efforts in passing legislation aimed at tightening restrictions against drunk driving offenders.

Klarides received an award from the Jewish Federation Association of Connecticut for her work concerning holocaust and genocide education.

Since 2006, she has served on Griffin Hospital’s the Board of Directors and in 2016 was named Second Vice Chair.

She is a former member of the Derby Planning and Zoning Commission and a former member of the Board of Finance in Seymour.

2022 Connecticut Senate election
On May 26, 2021, Klarides filed paperwork to explore a potential candidacy for Governor of Connecticut in 2022. On January 30, 2022, a week after Businessman and 2018 Republican Gubernatorial Nominee Bob Stefanowski announced his bid for the Republican gubernatorial nomination, Klarides announced a run for Connecticut's Class III Senate seat, currently held by Democratic Senator Richard Blumenthal.

Political career

Klarides was elected to the House of Representatives as a Republican in 1998 from the 114th District, serving the towns of Derby, Orange, and Woodbridge. She has been re-elected every term since. She served as the Deputy Minority leader from 2007 to 2014, when she was selected by the membership of her caucus to become the first female leader for the House Republicans effective with the 2015 session. As the House Minority Leader, she has become a leading advocate for fiscal restraint, regulatory reform, job creation and tax relief. She has been an outspoken critic of Governor Malloy and the Democratic tax policies that resulted in the two largest tax increases in state history.

Positions
Klarides has long advocated for reforms to Connecticut's sex offender registry. In 2015, she championed a bill that created a committee to review the state's sex offender registry laws and regulations. Her position is to have a registry that significantly increases the level of detail on an offender's profile.

The Radiological Society of Connecticut honored her in 2016 for her work in preventable healthcare services for women.

In 2017, Klarides led House Republicans in passing a bipartisan budget that included a bonding cap, a revenue cap, and a volatility cap. These measures resulted in the rebuilding of Connecticut's rainy day fund, as well as the additional payments made in 2021 towards the state's pension liabilities.

In 2019, Klarides argued against removing qualified immunity for police officers during debate on the Police Accountability Act. Klarides voted against the Police Accountability Act.

In 2018, Governor Malloy proposed implementing tolls to provide revenue for the Special Transportation Fund. Klarides defeated the proposal, and called it her signature achievement in the 2018 legislative session. In 2019, Governor Lamont made a push for tolls in Connecticut that failed to pass the legislature, with Klarides called one of "the biggest opponents of tolls".

In 2022, Klarides said she did not vote for President Donald Trump in the 2020 U.S. presidential election.

Election history

Personal life 
Klarides married Gregory Brian Butler on September 20, 2020 in Orange, Connecticut.

Gregory Brian Butler currently serves as Executive Vice President and General Counsel at the utility company Eversource.

Klarides dated professional wrestler Shawn Michaels in 1995.

References

External links
 

|-

1965 births
American people of Greek descent
21st-century American politicians
21st-century American women politicians
Candidates in the 2022 United States Senate elections
Living people
Republican Party members of the Connecticut House of Representatives
People from Seymour, Connecticut
Quinnipiac University alumni
Trinity College (Connecticut) alumni
Women state legislators in Connecticut